Gerrit de Graeff (I.) van Zuid-Polsbroek (27 February 1711 in Amsterdam – 10 November 1752) was a member of the De Graeff – Family from the Dutch Golden Age. De Graeff was "known for his wealth and notorious for his stinginess." De Graeff belonged to the patrician class of Amsterdam and held the feudal titles Free Lord of Zuid-Polsbroek as those of 21st Purmerland and Ilpendam.

Family
Gerrit was the son of Johan de Graeff and his wife Johanna Hooft.

In 1734 he married Maria Elisabeth Sautijn, and in 1739, after his first had died, with Elizabeth Lestevenon (1716–1766). Mattheus Lestevenon, the Dutch ambassador to France, became his brother-in-law. With his first wife he had one child, Joan de Graeff (1735-1754), his succeeder as Lord of Zuid-Polsbroek, who died at the age of 19. With his second wife he had six children; Abraham (1743–1744), Pieter (1746–1762) and Elisabeth Jacoba de Graeff (1748–1750) died young. The children who have reached adulthood are:
 Geertruid Joanna de Graeff (1740–1801) was first married to Isaac Ernst des H.R. Rijksbaron de Petersen (1737–1783), and in 1790 to Mr. François Jacob van de Wall (1756–1834).
 Gerrit de Graeff II. (1741–1811) married in 1765 Christina van Herzeele (1748–1798).
 Elisabeth Jacoba de Graeff 1751–1802 married in 1768 Jan des H.r. Rijksbaron De Petersen (1745–1786), the younger brother of Isaac Ernst.

Career, art and lifestyle
In 1732 De Graeff finished his studies at the University of Leiden. In 1736 he became one of the chairmen of the Dutch East Indies Company (VOC). One year later he was also appointed as one of the Chairmen of the Dutch West India Company (WIC). In 1739 he became a member of the vroedschap, and captain in the schutterij. From 1748 to 1752 he was one of the directors of the Company of Surinam and commissaris in Noorderkwartier.

Gerrit de Graeff lived at Herengracht, in a mansion now the Tassenmuseum Hendrikje. In the first half of the 18th century an extensive renovation of the building takes place, particularly of the interiors. In the large period room various ceiling paintings and a mantelpiece with richly carved and gilded ornaments were installed. A richly ornamented chimneypiece in the late Louis XIV style was placed in the small period room. Most of the time he resided at his castle Ilpenstein. He also owned Bronstee, a country estate near Heemstede.
De Graeff had a famous art collection, and sold some of the family paintings to an art dealer from Hamburg. William VIII, Landgrave of Hesse-Cassel bought Jacob Blessing the Sons of Joseph (the sitters were Wendela de Graeff and her two sons) and the Portrait of Andries de Graeff. The two famous paintings, both by Rembrandt, can be seen in Wilhelmshöhe in Kassel.

Noble titles

Literature
 Graeff, P. de (P. de Graeff Gerritsz en Dirk de Graeff van Polsbroek) Genealogie van de familie De Graeff van Polsbroek, Amsterdam 1882.
 Bruijn, J. H. de Genealogie van het geslacht De Graeff van Polsbroek 1529/1827, met bijlagen. De Bilt 1962–63.
 Moelker, H.P. De heerlijkheid Purmerland en Ilpendam'' (1978 Purmerend)
 Elias, J.E., De Vroedschap van Amsterdam 1578–1795 (1903–1905 Haarlem), p. 693.

Notes

1711 births
1752 deaths
Nobility from Amsterdam
Gerrit I, Graeff de
Lords of Purmerland and Ilpendam
Lords of Zuid-Polsbroek
Administrators of the Dutch East India Company
Administrators of the Dutch West India Company
Aldermen of Amsterdam
Dutch West India Company people from Amsterdam
Dutch East India Company people from Amsterdam